Philippe Celdran (born 2 November 1973) is a French former professional footballer who played as a midfielder between 1994 and 2006. He played for six different clubs in France including En Avant de Guingamp, ASOA Valence, CS Sedan Ardennes, Le Mans FC, AS Nancy and Amiens SC.

For his performances in the 2002–03 Ligue 2 season he was named in the 2002–03 Ligue 2 UNFP Team of the Year.

External links
 
 

1973 births
Living people
Sportspeople from Lorient
French footballers
Association football midfielders
Footballers from Brittany
En Avant Guingamp players
ASOA Valence players
CS Sedan Ardennes players
Le Mans FC players
AS Nancy Lorraine players
Amiens SC players
Ligue 1 players
Ligue 2 players